The Nansha Port railway is a railway line in Guangdong Province, China.

History
Construction began in 2016. During construction, this line was changed from a freight-only railway to a combined passenger and freight line. It opened on 31 December 2021 for freight.  railway station opened on 8 February 2022. Passenger services and the passenger-only railway stations are still under construction.

Design

Stations
 (freight)
 (freight)

References

Railway lines in China
Railway lines opened in 2021